Peter Moffett is an American drummer that has played for the punk rock bands Government Issue and Wool.

References

Year of birth missing (living people)
Living people
American punk rock drummers
Place of birth missing (living people)
Government Issue members
American male drummers